Keyamot Theke Keyamot is a Bangladeshi musical romantic drama film directed by Sohanur Rahman Sohan. The film was released on Eid vacation and was a huge success throughout Bangladesh. This movie was also the debut film of its two main leads Salman Shah and Moushumi, both of whom later became top movie stars in Bangladesh. The film is an official remake of the 1988 Hindi Language film titled Qayamat Se Qayamat Tak, and like its predecessor, is based on Romeo and Juliet.

Plot 
Mirza and Khan are two rival influential families in the village. The younger Khan son of the rich Khan family, Kabir Khan engages in a love affair with the younger Mirza sister, Dimple Mirza and makes her pregnant after dumping her. But Kabir, who's engaged to another girl, later refuses to marry Dimple after denying the allegations made by Boro Mirza which dishonours the Mirza family leading to the suicide of Dimple. Mirza Salauddin avenges death by killing Kabir, at his wedding, after showing him her body there and is sentenced to imprisonment. Boro Mirza leaves the village with Mirza Salauddin's wife Shahana and son Raj and move to Dhaka at his other's sister's house out of shame that their girl's lover will marry someone else especially after he impregnates her. He begins a successful clothing business with his brother-in-law Jamal. After Mirza Salauddin is released from prison, his son Raj falls in love with Reshma from the Khan family which resurfaces the old feud between the two families. When their families find out, they warn them to stop meeting each other. But being madly in love, they still meet secretly. Reshmi then gets engaged to her father Khan Bahadur Nazim Uddin's friend's son, Rakib Raihan, the man Raj posed as at her birthday party after he fell in love with her which heartbreaks him and shames him for loving an enemy. But Raj and Reshma elope to avoid the enmity between their families but this further complicates the situation. Khan Bahadur Nazim Uddin publishes his picture in the newspaper and offers a reward if he's found. Angered, Mirza Salauddin warns him he'll reluctantly become the killer Mirza Salauddin again if he harms Raj. Nazim Uddin, Rashmi's uncle Mukbul Hussain and cousin Selim hire killers to kill Raj when they learn their location. When they all arrive there, they send them to kill him. Nazim Uddin meets Reshmi and lies to her he accepted their marriage and has come to bring them home to which she gets thrilled. After his mother tells Raj's family about their hiring and begs them to save Raj and Rashmi's lives, Mirza Mohammad Salauddin, Boro Mirza and their nephew Sumon arrive there with her. Reshmi looks for Raj and is killed by the last surviving killer. Saddened, Raj kills him and runs to her. She dies in his arms and not tolerating to be separated from her, he commits suicide in front of his father, uncle, Sumon, Reshmi's grandma and dad. He then gives her a last kiss and lays with her. The lovers are eternally united, never to be separated.

Cast 
 Salman Shah as Raj
 Mousumi as Reshmi
 Rajib as Mirza Mohammad Salauddin, Raj's father
 Abul Hayat as Boro Mirza
 Ahmed Sharif as Khan Bahadur Nazim Uddin, Reshmi's father
 Shilpi as Dimple
 Mithu as Sumon
 Don as Selim
 Sirajul Islam Siraj as Khan Bahadur Roisuddin
 Jahanara Ahmed as Reshmi's grandmother
 Khaleda Akter Kolpona as Sahana, Raj's mother
 Abdur Ratin as Khan Bahadur Kabir Uddin
 Black Anwar as Jamal
 Tele Samad as Ghotok Ghuri
 Saif Uddin as Komol Ali
 Amol Bose as Talukder
 Kabir Kha
 AK Qureshi as Qureshi
 Zamilur Rahman Saka as Jailor

Production 
The production house Anandamela Cinema Limited bought remaking rights of three Hindi films including Qayamat Se Qayamat Tak and proposed the director Sohanur Rahman Sohan to make a film based on one of them. Sohanur Rahman Sohan decided to make a film with completely new leads. Moushumi, who was then an emerging model, was selected for the leading female role. Initially, Amin Khan was supposed to do the film as the lead protagonist in place of Salman Shah, but he was opted out of this film by director Sohanur Rahman Sohan and producer Sukumar Ranjan Ghosh and the leading male role was eventually given to Salman Shah after it was turned down by actor Tauquir Ahmed and model Adil Hossain Nobel.

Music 
Alam Khan worked as the music director of this remake film while the original music in Hindi was composed by the Anand–Milind duo. Lyrics are written by Moniruzzaman Monir. Music was recorded in Anupam Recording Studio and singers were Runa Laila and Agun. The film is also the playback debut of singer Agun.

Footnotes

References 

Bangladeshi romance films
Bangladeshi remakes of Indian films
Bengali-language Bangladeshi films
1993 films
Films based on Romeo and Juliet
Films scored by Anand–Milind
Films scored by Alam Khan
1990s Bengali-language films
1990s romance films
Films directed by Sohanur Rahman Sohan
Films shot in Cox's Bazar
Films set in Cox's Bazar